Porotica is  a genus of moths, belonging to the family Coleophoridae containing only one species, Porotica astragalis, which is known from South Africa.

References

Endemic moths of South Africa
Coleophoridae
Moths of Africa
Taxa named by Edward Meyrick
Monotypic moth genera